James Curdie Russell (1830-1925) was a Scottish minister. He served as Moderator of the General Assembly of the Church of Scotland in 1902.

Life

He was born in 1830.

He was minister of Campbeltown from 1854 and remained there for most of his life. He advocated the use of Gaelic in services.

He received an honorary doctorate (DD) in 1881 from  Glasgow University.
In 1903 (along with the Very Rev John Pagan) he was one of the several former Moderators invited to the official coronation of King Edward VII.

He retired to Edinburgh living at 9 Coates Gardens in the West End.

He died in 1925 and is buried with his wife in Dean Cemetery in western Edinburgh.

Bequests

He endowed three scholarships (Curdie Russell Scholarship) in Divinity to Glasgow University, with a preference to those versed in Gaelic.

Family

He was married to Martha Stevenson Watson (d.1916).

References

1830 births
1925 deaths
Moderators of the General Assembly of the Church of Scotland
19th-century Ministers of the Church of Scotland
20th-century Ministers of the Church of Scotland